Paththini is a guardian deity of Sri Lanka.

Paththini may also refer to:

 Paththini (1997 film), 1997 Tamil film
 Paththini (2016 film), 2016 Sinhala film